In Einstein's theory of general relativity, the Schwarzschild metric (also known as the Schwarzschild solution) is an 
exact solution to the Einstein field equations that describes the gravitational field outside a spherical mass, on the assumption that the electric charge of the mass, angular momentum of the mass, and universal cosmological constant are all zero. The solution is a useful approximation for describing slowly rotating astronomical objects such as many stars and planets, including Earth and the Sun. It was found by Karl Schwarzschild in 1916, and around the same time independently by Johannes Droste, who published his more complete and modern-looking discussion four months after Schwarzschild.

According to Birkhoff's theorem, the Schwarzschild metric is the most general spherically symmetric vacuum solution of the Einstein field equations. A Schwarzschild black hole or static black hole is a black hole that has neither electric charge nor angular momentum. A Schwarzschild black hole is described by the Schwarzschild metric, and cannot be distinguished from any other Schwarzschild black hole except by its mass.

The Schwarzschild black hole is characterized by a surrounding spherical boundary, called the event horizon, which is situated at the Schwarzschild radius, often called the radius of a black hole. The boundary is not a physical surface, and a person who fell through the event horizon (before being torn apart by tidal forces), would not notice any physical surface at that position; it is a mathematical surface which is significant in determining the black hole's properties. Any non-rotating and non-charged mass that is smaller than its Schwarzschild radius forms a black hole. The solution of the Einstein field equations is valid for any mass , so in principle (according to general relativity theory) a Schwarzschild black hole of any mass could exist if conditions became sufficiently favorable to allow for its formation.

In the vicinity of a Schwarschild black hole, space curves so much that even light rays are deflected, and very nearby light can be deflected so much that it travels several times around the black hole.

Formulation 

The Schwarzschild metric is a spherically symmetric Lorentzian metric (here, with signature convention ,) defined on (a subset of) 
 
The Schwarzschild metric is a solution of Einstein's field equations in empty space, meaning that it is valid only outside the gravitating body.

In Schwarzschild coordinates  the Schwarzschild metric (or equivalently, the line element for proper time) has the form

where  is the metric on the two sphere, i.e. . Furthermore,  
  is positive for timelike curves, in which case  is the proper time (time measured by a clock moving along the same world line with a test particle),
  is the speed of light,
  is a point on the two sphere ,

It also seems to have a singularity on the event horizon . Depending on the point of view, the metric is therefore defined only on the exterior region , only on the interior region  or their disjoint union. However, the metric is actually non-singular across the event horizon, as one sees in suitable coordinates (see below). For , the Schwarzschild metric is asymptotic to the standard Lorentz metric on Minkowski space. For almost all astrophysical objects, the ratio  is extremely small. The ratio becomes large only in close proximity to black holes and other ultra-dense objects such as neutron stars.

The radial coordinate turns out to have physical significance as the "proper distance between two events that occur simultaneously relative to the radially moving geodesic clocks, the two events lying on the same radial coordinate line".

The Schwarzschild solution is analogous to a classical Newtonian theory of gravity that corresponds to the gravitational field around a point particle.
Even at the surface of the Earth, the corrections to Newtonian gravity are only one part in a billion.

History 
The Schwarzschild solution is named in honour of Karl Schwarzschild, who found the exact solution in 1915 and published it in January 1916, a little more than a month after the publication of Einstein's theory of general relativity.
It was the first exact solution of the Einstein field equations other than the trivial flat space solution. Schwarzschild died shortly after his paper was published, as a result of a disease he developed while serving in the German army during World War I.

Johannes Droste in 1916
independently produced the same solution as Schwarzschild, using a simpler, more direct derivation.

In the early years of general relativity there was a lot of confusion about the nature of the singularities found in the Schwarzschild and other solutions of the Einstein field equations. In Schwarzschild's original paper, he put what we now call the event horizon at the origin of his coordinate system. In this paper he also introduced what is now known as the Schwarzschild radial coordinate ( in the equations above), as an auxiliary variable. In his equations, Schwarzschild was using a different radial coordinate that was zero at the Schwarzschild radius.

They, however, did not recognize that their solutions were just coordinate transforms, and in fact used their solution to argue that Einstein's theory was wrong. In 1939 Howard Robertson showed that a free falling observer descending in the Schwarzschild metric would cross the  singularity in a finite amount of proper time even though this would take an infinite amount of time in terms of coordinate time .

A similar result was later rediscovered by George Szekeres, and independently Martin Kruskal. The new coordinates nowadays known as Kruskal-Szekeres coordinates were much simpler than Synge's but both provided a single set of coordinates that covered the entire spacetime. However, perhaps due to the obscurity of the journals in which the papers of Lemaître and Synge were published their conclusions went unnoticed, with many of the major players in the field including Einstein believing that the singularity at the Schwarzschild radius was physical. Synge's later derivation of the Szekeres-Kruskal metric solution, which was motivated by a desire to avoid "using 'bad' [Schwarzschild] coordinates to obtain 'good' [Szekeres-Kruskal] coordinates," has been generally under-appreciated in the literature, but was adopted by Chandrasekhar in his black hole monograph.

Real progress was made in the 1960s when the more exact tools of differential geometry entered the field of general relativity, allowing more exact definitions of what it means for a Lorentzian manifold to be singular. This led to definitive identification of the  singularity in the Schwarzschild metric as an event horizon (a hypersurface in spacetime that can be crossed in only one direction).

Singularities and black holes 
For ordinary stars and planets this is always the case.

The singularity at  divides the Schwarzschild coordinates in two disconnected patches. The Schwarzschild coordinates therefore give no physical connection between the two patches, which may be viewed as separate solutions. As the name implies, the singularity arises from a bad choice of coordinates or coordinate conditions. Using a different coordinate transformation one can then relate the extended external patch to the inner patch.

The case  is different, however. If one asks that the solution be valid for all  one runs into a true physical singularity, or gravitational singularity, at the origin. To see that this is a true singularity one must look at quantities that are independent of the choice of coordinates. One such important quantity is the Kretschmann invariant, which is given by

At  the curvature becomes infinite, indicating the presence of a singularity. At this point the metric cannot be extended in a smooth manner (the Kretschmann invariant involves second derivatives of the metric), spacetime itself is then no longer well-defined. Furthermore, Sbierski  showed the metric cannot be extended even in a continuous manner. For a long time it was thought that such a solution was non-physical. However, a greater understanding of general relativity led to the realization that such singularities were a generic feature of the theory and not just an exotic special case.

The Schwarzschild solution, taken to be valid for all , is called a Schwarzschild black hole. It is a perfectly valid solution of the Einstein field equations, although (like other black holes) it has rather bizarre properties. For  the Schwarzschild radial coordinate  becomes timelike and the time coordinate  becomes spacelike. A curve at constant  is no longer a possible worldline of a particle or observer, not even if a force is exerted to try to keep it there; this occurs because spacetime has been curved so much that the direction of cause and effect (the particle's future light cone) points into the singularity. The surface  demarcates what is called the event horizon of the black hole. It represents the point past which light can no longer escape the gravitational field. Any physical object whose radius  becomes less than or equal to the Schwarzschild radius has undergone gravitational collapse and become a black hole.

Alternative coordinates 
The Schwarzschild solution can be expressed in a range of different choices of coordinates besides the Schwarzschild coordinates used above. Different choices tend to highlight different features of the solution. The table below shows some popular choices.

In table above, some shorthand has been introduced for brevity. The speed of light  has been set to one. The notation

is used for the metric of a unit radius 2-dimensional sphere. Moreover, in each entry  and  denote alternative choices of radial and time coordinate for the particular coordinates.

The Kruskal–Szekeres coordinates have the form to which the Belinski–Zakharov transform can be applied. This implies that the Schwarzschild black hole is a form of gravitational soliton.

Flamm's paraboloid 

The spatial curvature of the Schwarzschild solution for  can be visualized as the graphic shows. Consider a constant time equatorial slice through the Schwarzschild solution (= constant) and let the position of a particle moving in this plane be described with the remaining Schwarzschild coordinates . Imagine now that there is an additional Euclidean dimension , which has no physical reality (it is not part of spacetime). Then replace the  plane with a surface dimpled in the  direction according to the equation (Flamm's paraboloid)

This surface has the property that distances measured within it match distances in the Schwarzschild metric, because with the definition of w above,

Thus, Flamm's paraboloid is useful for visualizing the spatial curvature of the Schwarzschild metric. It should not, however, be confused with a gravity well. No ordinary (massive or massless) particle can have a worldline lying on the paraboloid, since all distances on it are spacelike (this is a cross-section at one moment of time, so any particle moving on it would have an infinite velocity). A tachyon could have a spacelike worldline that lies entirely on a single paraboloid. However, even in that case its geodesic path is not the trajectory one gets through a "rubber sheet" analogy of gravitational well: in particular, if the dimple is drawn pointing upward rather than downward, the tachyon's geodesic path still curves toward the central mass, not away. See the gravity well article for more information.

Flamm's paraboloid may be derived as follows. The Euclidean metric in the cylindrical coordinates  is written

Letting the surface be described by the function , the Euclidean metric can be written as

Comparing this with the Schwarzschild metric in the equatorial plane at a fixed time ( = constant)

yields an integral expression for :

whose solution is Flamm's paraboloid.

Orbital motion 

The circular orbit of minimum radius  corresponds to an orbital velocity approaching the speed of light.

Noncircular orbits, such as Mercury's, dwell longer at small radii than would be expected in Newtonian gravity. This can be seen as a less extreme version of the more dramatic case in which a particle passes through the event horizon and dwells inside it forever. Intermediate between the case of Mercury and the case of an object falling past the event horizon, there are exotic possibilities such as knife-edge orbits, in which the satellite can be made to execute an arbitrarily large number of nearly circular orbits, after which it flies back outward.

Symmetries 
The group of isometries of the Schwarzschild metric is the subgroup of the ten-dimensional Poincaré group which takes the time axis (trajectory of the star) to itself. It omits the spatial translations (three dimensions) and boosts (three dimensions). It retains the time translations (one dimension) and rotations (three dimensions). Thus it has four dimensions. Like the Poincaré group, it has four connected components: the component of the identity; the time reversed component; the spatial inversion component; and the component which is both time reversed and spatially inverted.

Curvatures
The Ricci curvature scalar and the Ricci curvature tensor are both zero. Non-zero components of the Riemann curvature tensor are

Components which are obtainable by the symmetries of the Riemann tensor are not displayed.

To understand the physical meaning of these quantities, it is useful to express the curvature tensor in an orthonormal basis. In an orthonormal basis of an observer the non-zero components in geometric units are

Again, components which are obtainable by the symmetries of the Riemann tensor are not displayed. These results are invariant to any Lorentz boost, thus the components do not change for non-static observers.

See also 
 Derivation of the Schwarzschild solution
 Reissner–Nordström metric (charged, non-rotating solution)
 Kerr metric (uncharged, rotating solution)
 Kerr–Newman metric (charged, rotating solution)
 Black hole, a general review
 Schwarzschild coordinates
 Kruskal–Szekeres coordinates
 Eddington–Finkelstein coordinates
 Gullstrand–Painlevé coordinates
 Lemaitre coordinates (Schwarzschild solution in synchronous coordinates)
 Frame fields in general relativity (Lemaître observers in the Schwarzschild vacuum)
 Tolman–Oppenheimer–Volkoff equation (metric and pressure equations of a static and spherically symmetric body of isotropic material)
 Planck length

Notes

References 

 Text of the original paper, in Wikisource
 Translation: 
 A commentary on the paper, giving a simpler derivation: 
 

 Text of the original paper, in Wikisource
 Translation: 

 
 
 
 
 
 
 

Exact solutions in general relativity
Black holes
1916 in science